Thun-Saint-Martin is a commune in the Nord department in northern France.

Heraldry

Sister cities

  Kincardine O'Neil, Scotland

See also
Communes of the Nord department

References

Thunsaintmartin